Seven ships of the British Royal Navy have been named HMS Orion, after the hunter Orion of Greek mythology:
  was a 74-gun third-rate ship of the line launched in 1787 and broken up in 1814.
  was an 80-gun second-rate screw ship launched in 1854 and broken up in 1867.
  was an armoured corvette built for the Ottoman Empire but purchased by the Royal Navy in 1878 and launched in 1879. She was converted to a depot ship and renamed HMS Orontes in 1909, and was sold in 1913.
 HMS Orion was to have been an armoured cruiser. She was projected in 1904 but never built.
  was an  launched in 1910 and sold in 1922.
  was a  light cruiser launched in 1932 and sold in 1949.
 Orion was a French submarine seized in 1940, laid up until 1943 and then broken up.

Battle honours 

 First of June 1794
 Groix Island 1795
 St Vincent 1797
 Nile 1801
 Trafalgar 1805
 Baltic 1855
 Jutland 1916
 Atlantic 1939
 Calabria 1940
 Mediterranean 1940-44
 Malta Convoys 1941
 Matapan 1941
 Greece 1941
 Crete 1941
 Sicily 1943
 Salerno 1943
 Aegean 1944
 Anzio 1944
 Normandy 1944
 South France 1944

See also
 , two ships of the Swedish Navy
 , various ships named Orion

References
 

Royal Navy ship names